The Peery Apartments is a historic three-story building within the Ogden Central Bench Historic District in Ogden, Utah, United States, that is individually listed on the National Register of Historic Places (NRHP}.

Description
The structure was built in 1909-1910 as an investment for the David H. Peery family, and designed in the Prairie School style by architects Julius A. Smith and Leslie Simmons Hodgson.

It was listed on the NRHP December 31, 1987.

See also

 National Register of Historic Places listings in Weber County, Utah

References

External links

Buildings and structures in Ogden, Utah
National Register of Historic Places in Weber County, Utah
Prairie School architecture in Utah
Residential buildings completed in 1909
1909 establishments in Utah